Howard James Richardson (29 October 1894 – 21 December 1959) was an Australian sportsman who played first-class cricket for Victoria and Australian rules football in the Victorian Football League (VFL) with Richmond and Melbourne.

Richardson, who was born in Narre Warren, played his early football at Berwick before making his debut for Richmond in the 1915 VFL season. He made sporadic appearances over the next couple of seasons and, after not playing at all in 1918, he crossed to Melbourne. Richardson took the field only once at Melbourne and finished his league career with 20 games and 14 goals.

At Hobart in 1924, Richardson played his only first-class cricket match with Victoria taking on Tasmania. He was his state's best bowler in the first innings when he took 4/34 and also contributed an unbeaten 29 with the bat.

See also
 List of Victoria first-class cricketers

References

External links

Cricinfo: Howard Richardson

1894 births
1959 deaths
People from Narre Warren
Richmond Football Club players
Melbourne Football Club players
Australian cricketers
Victoria cricketers
Cricketers from Victoria (Australia)
Australian rules footballers from Melbourne